The Allan Herschell 3-Abreast Carousel is a carousel built in 1916 by the Allan Herschell Company. The carousel features 35 hand-carved jumping wooden horses and two hand-carved chariots which serve as benches. The carousel is one of only four large carousels made by the Allan Herschell Company between 1915 and 1927; in addition, the horses on the outer rim feature gentle faces and detailed, deep woodwork, making them a rarity among the company's designs. 

After likely operating in an amusement park in the eastern United States, the carousel moved to Seaport Village in San Diego; it began operating in Chase Palm Park, a waterfront park in Santa Barbara, California, in 1999.

The carousel was listed on the National Register of Historic Places in 2000.

The owner of the carousel, Historic Carousels Inc., announced in November 2017 that they planned to move it to a carousel museum in Hood River, Oregon.

References

External links
 Photos of the carousel by Anita Ritenour, National Carousel Association

Carousels in California
Buildings and structures in Santa Barbara, California
Amusement rides introduced in 1916
Carousels on the National Register of Historic Places in California
National Register of Historic Places in Santa Barbara County, California
Tourist attractions in Santa Barbara, California